Kimberly "Kim" Anderson (born January 28, 1968) is an American road cyclist. In 2009, she won La Route de France.

She now owns a coffee roaster and cafe with her long term partner in Santa Barbara, CA.

References

External links
 

1968 births
American female cyclists
Living people
Place of birth missing (living people)
21st-century American women